Elland Road Greyhound Stadium also known as Leeds Greyhound Stadium was a greyhound racing stadium in Leeds, West Yorkshire.

The stadium is not to be confused with the football ground Elland Road or Fullerton Park.

Origins and opening
Elland Road football stadium was built in 1897 and thirty years later in 1927 two stadiums were constructed on its west side. The first Fullerton Park was built directly next door to the football stadium on the north side of Elland Road and the second Elland Road Greyhound Stadium was constructed opposite Fullerton Park on the south side of Elland Road.

The stadium opened on Saturday 16 July 1927 and featured racing every Monday, Wednesday and Saturday evening with an additional Saturday matinee at 3.00pm. Races took place over 300, 500 and 750 yards on a circuit with a tight 400 yard circumference. Resident kennels within the stadium grounds numbered 120 and exercise grounds were situated adjacent to the stadium.

Pre Second World War history 
A bitter battle took place during 1927 between the Leeds Greyhound Association Ltd (LGA) owners of the Elland Road track and the Greyhound Racing Association (GRA) owners of Fullerton Park which had opened just three months later. The LGA took the GRA to court for false advertising following the public claim by the GRA that they had sole rights of greyhounds chasing electric hares and this upset other companies because it implied that they were the only company allowed to race greyhounds.

The GRA quickly realised that their greyhound stadium being so close to Elland Road stadium would not be able to monopolise trade in the city. This resulted in them closing Fullerton Park to greyhound racing and buying a stake in the LGA. The early 1930s brought about government legislation issues with the totalisator; it would have to be closed down on more than one occasion following questions over the legality of using the system. Despite the issues the track maintained a very healthy business and even introduced professional baseball before the start of the war. Mark Barker the Racing Manager and a Director at Leeds United died in 1943 following illness and the racing was held sporadically during the duration of the war.

Post Second World War history 

Following the war business boomed in 1946 with the tote turnover being £1,167,103. The profits enabled the company to upgrade the facilities and Harold Richards was brought in as Racing Manager in the early 1950s. Two competitions were inaugurated; the Ebor Stakes was introduced in 1951 followed by the Yorkshire Two Year Old Produce in 1958.

In the early 1960s Totalisators and Greyhound Holdings (T.G.H) purchased the track and added it to their portfolio of existing tracks. Racing was held on Monday and Saturday evenings and the amenities included five buffet bars, five licensed bars and a restaurant. The hare was an 'Outside Sumner' hare and the resident trainers were Tommy Brown, Joe Kelly, Alf Eggleston and Ann Harrison.

Successful Leeds greyhounds were Lisamote Precept trained by Joe Kelly who won the International, Lincoln and the 1968 Scottish Greyhound Derby, Brilane Clipper won the 1970 Scottish Derby. In 1971 Leeds won the annual Duke of Edinburgh Cup after defeating Clapton Stadium in the final.

During the 1970s Ladbrokes acquired the Totalisators and Greyhound Holdings (T.G.H) group which included the tracks at Brough Park, Crayford & Bexleyheath Stadium, Gosforth, Willenhall and Monmore. The track kennels were demolished in 1979 forcing Tommy Brown and Jim Brennan to retire and Joe Kelly switched to Owlerton; they were replaced by contracted trainers Pete Beaumont, Jim Brown and Ray Andrews.

Between 1973 and 1980 the stadium was the home ground of Hunslet RLFC, the original club's Parkside ground not being available to the new club.

Closure

Tim Hale and Derek Bowman replaced Racing Manager Harry Bridger on 1 January 1981 but would only oversee the action for one year because Ladbrokes closed the track. The last meeting was held on 15 March 1982 with the last winner being Mike Supreme.
In 2014 the new Leeds District Police HQ opened on the site of the stadium.

Competitions
Yorkshire Puppy Derby

Ebor Stakes
The Ebor Stakes was a competition held from 1951 until the stadium closed. 

1951-1968 (500 yards), 1956-1958 (not held), 1970-1974 (650 yards), 1975-1976 (600 metres), 1977-1981 (650 metres), 1982-1982 (held at Owlerton)

Yorkshire Two-Year Old Produce Stakes

(1958-1969 500 yards)

Track records

References

Defunct greyhound racing venues in the United Kingdom
Sports venues in Leeds
Defunct sports venues in West Yorkshire